Hechtia is a genus of plants in the family Bromeliaceae, and is the sole genus of the subfamily Hechtioideae, containing 75 species. Its species are native to Mexico, Central America, and Texas.

The genus is named for Julius Gottfried Conrad Hecht (1771–1837), German counselor to the King of Prussia. Except for H. gayorum, the plants of this genus are dioecious.

Species
 Hechtia aquamarina I.Ramírez & C.F.Jiménez - Puebla
 Hechtia argentea Baker - Querétaro
 Hechtia bracteata Mez - Citlaltépetl (Puebla + Veracruz)
 Hechtia caerulea (Matuda) L.B.Sm. - San Luis Potosí, México State, Guerrero
 Hechtia capituligera Mez - San Luis Potosí
 Hechtia carlsoniae Burt-Utley & J.Utley - Guerrero
 Hechtia caudata L.B.Sm. - Oaxaca
 Hechtia caulescens López-Ferr., Espejo & Mart.-Correa - Oaxaca
 Hechtia chichinautzensis Mart.-Correa, Espejo & López-Ferr. - Morelos
 Hechtia colossa Mart.-Correa, Espejo & López-Ferr. - Puebla, Oaxaca
 Hechtia complanata Burt-Utley - Oaxaca
 Hechtia confusa L.B.Sm. - Puebla, Oaxaca
 Hechtia conzattiana L.B.Sm. - Puebla, Oaxaca
 Hechtia dichroantha Donnell Smith - Guatemala, Honduras
 Hechtia edulis I.Ramírez, Espejo & López-Ferr. - Chihuahua
 Hechtia elliptica L.B.Sm. - Coahuila
 Hechtia epigyna  Harms - Tamaulipas, Hidalgo
 Hechtia fosteriana L.B.Sm. - Oaxaca
 Hechtia fragilis Burt-Utley & J.Utley - Puebla, Oaxaca
 Hechtia galeottii Mez - Oaxaca
 Hechtia gayorum L.W.Lenz - Baja California Sur
 Hechtia glabra Brandegee - Veracruz
 Hechtia glauca Burt-Utley & J.Utley - Michoacán
 Hechtia glomerata Zucc. - from Texas to Guatemala
 Hechtia guatemalensis Mez - Chiapas, Guatemala, Honduras, El Salvador, Nicaragua 
 Hechtia gypsophila López-Ferr., Espejo & Hern.-Cárdenas - Oaxaca
 Hechtia hintoniana Burt-Utley, Utley & García-Mend. - México State, Michoacán
 Hechtia iltisii Burt-Utley & J.Utley - Jalisco
 Hechtia isthmusiana Burt-Utley - Oaxaca
 Hechtia ixtlanensis Burt-Utley - Oaxaca
 Hechtia jaliscana L.B.Sm. - Jalisco
 Hechtia laevis L.B.Sm. - Colima
 Hechtia lanata L.B.Sm. - Oaxaca
 Hechtia laxissima L.B.Sm. - Michoacán 
 Hechtia lepidophylla I.Ramírez - Querétaro, Hidalgo
 Hechtia lundelliorum L.B.Sm. - San Luis Potosí
 Hechtia lyman-smithii Burt-Utley & J.Utley - Oaxaca
 Hechtia malvernii Gilmartin - Honduras
 Hechtia marnier-lapostollei L.B.Sm. - México State, Oaxaca
 Hechtia matudae L.B.Sm. - Morelos
 Hechtia melanocarpa L.B.Sm. - Guerrero
 Hechtia mexicana L.B.Sm. - Tamaulipas, San Luis Potosí
 Hechtia michoacana Burt-Utley, Utley & García-Mend. - Michoacán 
 Hechtia minuta Hern-Cárdenas, Espejo & López-Ferr. - Oaxaca
 Hechtia montana Brandegee - Baja California, Baja California Sur, Sonora, Sinaloa
 Hechtia mooreana L.B.Smith - Guerrero
 Hechtia myriantha Mez - Veracruz
 Hechtia nuusaviorum Espejo & López-Ferrari - Oaxaca
 Hechtia oaxacana Burt-Utley, Utley & García-Mend. - Oaxaca
 Hechtia pedicellata S.Watson - Jalisco
 Hechtia perotensis I.Ramírez & Martínez-Correa - Puebla
 Hechtia podantha Mez - Coahuila, Oaxaca, Hidalgo, Jalisco, Morelos, Puebla
 Hechtia pretiosa Espejo & López-Ferrari - Guanajuato
 Hechtia pringlei B.L.Rob. & Greenm. - Oaxaca
 Hechtia pueblensis Burt-Utley, Utley & García-Mend. - Puebla
 Hechtia pumila Burt-Utley & J. Utley - Guerrero
 Hechtia purpusii Brandegee - Veracruz
 Hechtia reflexa L.B.Sm. - Michoacán, Guerrero
 Hechtia reticulata L.B.Sm. - Colima
 Hechtia rosea E.Morren ex Baker - Hidalgo, Veracruz, Oaxaca, Chiapas
 Hechtia roseana L.B.Sm. - Puebla, Oaxaca
 Hechtia schottii Baker ex Hemsley - Campeche, Yucatán
 Hechtia sphaeroblasta B.L.Rob. - Guerrero, Oaxaca, Puebla
 Hechtia stenopetala Klotzsch - Hidalgo, Veracruz
 Hechtia suaveolens E. Morren ex Mez - home range unknown; probably extinct
 Hechtia subalata L.B.Smith - Durango, Nayarit
 Hechtia texensis S.Watson - Chihuahua, Coahuila, Zacatecas, Texas
 Hechtia tillandsioides (André) L.B.Sm. - Hidalgo, México State
 Hechtia zamudioi Espejo, López-Ferrari & I.Ramírez - Querétaro

References

External links

 BSI Genera Gallery  photos

 
Bromeliaceae genera
Taxa named by Johann Friedrich Klotzsch
Dioecious plants